VX or vx may refer to:

Science and technology
 VX (nerve agent), a neurotoxic chemical warfare agent
Chinese VX, structural isomer of VX
V-sub x, another organophosphate nerve agent of the V-series
 VX Nano, a brand of optical mouse by Logitech
 VX Revolution, a brand of optical mouse by Logitech
 Yaesu VX series, compact amateur radio handheld transceivers
 VX (videocassette format), an early consumer videocassette format produced by Panasonic
 Vx Multiphase Metering Technology for measuring oil, gas and water flowrates without phase separation in oil and gas industry
 WeChat colloquially referred to as "VX", a Chinese multi-purpose messaging, social media, and mobile payment app developed by Tencent

Transport
 ACES Colombia (IATA code VX, 1971-2003), a Colombian airline
 Name of the 2013 to 2017 Dodge Viper
 Holden Commodore (VX), model of GM Holden's Commodore car
 Para-Ski VX, a Canadian powered parachute design
 VX, the speed that allows an aircraft the best angle of climb
 Virgin America (IATA code VX, 2004-2018), a U.S. airline

Other uses
 VX (sport), a ball sport
 RPG Maker VX, an RPG Maker game